John Paterson Smyth (1852–1932) was an Anglican priest, academic  and author.

Paterson Smyth was born in Killarney on 2 February 1852. He was educated at Trinity College, Dublin. He was ordained deacon in 1880; and priest in 1881. He served curacies at Lisburn Cathedral and Harold's Cross. He was Professor of Pastoral theology at TCDfrom 1902 to 1907. In 1907 he emigrated to Canada. He was Rector of St George, Montreal from 1907 until 1926. He was  Archdeacon of Montreal from 1924 until 1926.

He died on 14 February 1932.

Books
 1902 The Bible for Home and School 
 1911 The Gospel of the Hereafter 
 1915 The men who die in battle
 1922 A People's life of Christ
 1923 On the rim of the world

References

External links

 The Bible for School and Home

Alumni of Trinity College Dublin
Fellows of Trinity College Dublin
Academics of Trinity College Dublin
19th-century Irish Anglican priests
20th-century Canadian Anglican priests
Archdeacons of Montreal
People from Killarney
1932 deaths
1852 births